The 2018–19 season was the 15th season in the history of the Scarlets, a Welsh regional rugby union side based in Llanelli, Carmarthenshire. In this season, they competed in the Pro14 and the European Rugby Champions Cup. This season, Welsh internationals Scott Williams and Aled Davies, Scottish international John Barclay and Irishman Tadhg Beirne were high-profile departures, while new recruits included internationals Kieron Fonotia, Uzair Cassiem and Sam Hidalgo-Clyne.

Pre-season and friendlies

Pro 14

Fixtures

Champions Cup play-off

Table
Conference B

Rugby Champions Cup

Fixtures

Table

Statistics
(+ in the Apps column denotes substitute appearance, positions listed are the ones they have started a game in during the season)

Stats accurate as of match played 18 May 2019

Transfers

In

Out

References 

2018-19
2018–19 Pro14 by team
2018–19 in Welsh rugby union
2018–19 European Rugby Champions Cup by team